The 1988–89 Scottish Inter-District Championship was a rugby union competition for Scotland's district teams.

This season saw the 36th formal Scottish Inter-District Championship.

Edinburgh District won the competition with four wins.

1988-89 League Table

Results

Matches outwith the Championship

Trial matches

Blues: 

Reds:

References

1988–89 in Scottish rugby union
1988–89
Scot